Events from the year 1965 in Japan.

Incumbents
Emperor: Hirohito
Prime Minister: Eisaku Satō (Liberal Democratic)
Chief Cabinet Secretary: Tomisaburo Hashimoto
Chief Justice of the Supreme Court: Kisaburo Yokota
President of the House of Representatives: Naka Funada until December 20, Kikuchirō Yamaguchi
President of the House of Councillors: Yūzō Shigemune

Governors
Aichi Prefecture: Mikine Kuwahara 
Akita Prefecture: Yūjirō Obata 
Aomori Prefecture: Shunkichi Takeuchi 
Chiba Prefecture: Taketo Tomonō 
Ehime Prefecture: Sadatake Hisamatsu 
Fukui Prefecture: Eizō Kita 
Fukuoka Prefecture: Taichi Uzaki
Fukushima Prefecture: Morie Kimura
Gifu Prefecture: Yukiyasu Matsuno 
Gunma Prefecture: Konroku Kanda 
Hiroshima Prefecture: Iduo Nagano 
Hokkaido: Kingo Machimura 
Hyogo Prefecture: Motohiko Kanai 
Ibaraki Prefecture: Nirō Iwakami 
Ishikawa Prefecture: Yōichi Nakanishi 
Iwate Prefecture: Tadashi Chida 
Kagawa Prefecture: Masanori Kaneko 
Kagoshima Prefecture: Katsushi Terazono 
Kanagawa Prefecture: Iwataro Uchiyama 
Kochi Prefecture: Masumi Mizobuchi 
Kumamoto Prefecture: Kōsaku Teramoto 
Kyoto Prefecture: Torazō Ninagawa 
Mie Prefecture: Satoru Tanaka 
Miyagi Prefecture: Yoshio Miura (until 8 February); Shintaro Takahashi (starting 31 March)
Miyazaki Prefecture: Hiroshi Kuroki 
Nagano Prefecture: Gon'ichirō Nishizawa 
Nagasaki Prefecture: Katsuya Sato 
Nara Prefecture: Ryozo Okuda 
Niigata Prefecture: Juichiro Tsukada
Oita Prefecture: Kaoru Kinoshita 
Okayama Prefecture: Takenori Kato 
Osaka Prefecture: Gisen Satō 
Saga Prefecture: Sunao Ikeda 
Saitama Prefecture: Hiroshi Kurihara 
Shiga Prefecture: Kyujiro Taniguchi 
Shiname Prefecture: Choemon Tanabe 
Shizuoka Prefecture: Toshio Saitō 
Tochigi Prefecture: Nobuo Yokokawa 
Tokushima Prefecture: Kikutaro Hara (until 15 September); Yasunobu Takeichi (starting 9 October)
Tokyo: Ryōtarō Azuma 
Tottori Prefecture: Jirō Ishiba 
Toyama Prefecture: Minoru Yoshida 
Wakayama Prefecture: Shinji Ono 
Yamagata Prefecture: Tōkichi Abiko 
Yamaguchi Prefecture: Masayuki Hashimoto 
Yamanashi Prefecture: Hisashi Amano

Events
February 14 - An All Nippon Airways Douglas DC-3 aircraft crashes into Mount Nakanoone in Shizuoka Prefecture, killing both occupants of the plane.
February 22 - A gas explosion at a coal mine in Hokkaido kills 61.
June 1 - Coal mine explosion in Fukuoka Prefecture kills 237.
June 22 - Treaty on Basic Relations between Japan and the Republic of Korea signed in Tokyo.
August 1 - According to an official confirmed report from the Japan Coast Guard, the cruise ship Yasoshima Maru collided with a runaway tugboat and capsized in Osaka Bay, total 20 passenger and crew were lost to lives. 
September 18 - Comet Ikeya–Seki first sighted by Japanese astronomers.
October 7 - Seven Japanese fishing boat capsized near Agrihan Island by Typhoon Carmen, According to an official confirmed report from the JCG, total 209 crew were fatalities.
 October 15 - Meijō Line begins operations.
 Unknown date – Kyoto Sangyo University was founded.

Births
 January 5 - Rei Sakuma, voice actress
 January 14 - Shouhei Kusaka (Born Hiroshi Tokoro), actor of 1989 Metal Hero Series Kidou Keiji Jiban.
 February 18 – Masaki Saito, former professional baseball pitcher 
 March 20 - Taeko Kawata, voice actress
 March 21 - Wakana Yamazaki, voice actress
 April 15 - Sōichi Noguchi, astronaut
 April 22 - Arihiro Hase, actor and voice actor (d. 1996)
 May 2 - Aohisa Takayasu, actor of 1992 Super Sentai Series Kyoryu Sentai Zyuranger.
 May 8 - Momoko Sakura, Japanese manga artist (Chibi Maruko-chan) (d. 2018)
 May 10 - Kiyoyuki Yanada, voice actor
 May 13 - Hikari Ōta, comedian
 May 23 - Kappei Yamaguchi, voice actor
 May 24 - Shinichiro Watanabe, anime director
 May 31 - Yōko Sōmi, voice actress
 June 6 - Megumi Ogata, voice actress and singer
 June 11 - Yasuko Sawaguchi, actress
 July 3 - Shinya Hashimoto, professional wrestler (d. 2005)
 July 13 - Akina Nakamori, pop singer and actress. 
 August 2 - Hisanobu Watanabe, baseball player and coach
 August 18
 Kōji Kikkawa, singer
 Ikue Ōtani, voice actress
 August 28 - Satoshi Tajiri, video game designer, creator of Pokémon
 September 27 - Robert Baldwin, actor 
 October 4 - Michiko Neya, voice actress
 October 7 - Kumiko Watanabe, voice actress
 November 20 
 Yoshiki Hayashi, rock composer, pianist and drummer (X Japan)
 Takeshi Kusao, voice actor
 November 21 - Yuriko Yamaguchi, voice actress
 November 29 - Yutaka Ozaki, songwriter and rock star (d. 1992)
 December 7 - Teruyuki Kagawa, actor
 December 8 - Kotono Mitsuishi, voice actress
 December 26 - Toshihide Wakamatsu, actor of 1991 Super Sentai Series Chojin Sentai Jetman.

Deaths
March 4 – Hachirō Arita, politician (b. 1884)
July 19 – Haruo Umezaki, writer (b. 1915)
July 28 – Rampo Edogawa, author and critic (b. 1894)
July 30 – Jun'ichirō Tanizaki, writer, novelist (b. 1886)
August 13 – Hayato Ikeda, Prime Minister (b. 1899)
December 27 – Morita Fukui, lawyer, prosecutor, politician and first Commissioner of baseball in Japan (b. 1885)
December 29 – Kosaku Yamada, composer and conductor (b. 1886)

See also
 1965 in Japanese television
 List of Japanese films of 1965

References

 
1960s in Japan
Years of the 20th century in Japan